The TARIC code (TARif Intégré Communautaire; Integrated Tariff of the European Communities) is designed to show the various rules applying to specific products when imported into the EU. This includes the provisions of the harmonised system and the combined nomenclature but also additional provisions specified in Community legislation such as tariff suspensions, tariff quotas and tariff preferences, which exist for the majority of the Community’s trading partners. In trade with third countries, the 10-digit Taric code must be used in customs and statistical declarations.

Challenges in classification for companies
A proper classification can save huge amount of money for the company, which is why nowadays importers and exporters strive to find a perfect way to solve those problems:
 Variety of products  Companies who do import and export meet challenges of how to classify products with the growing varieties of products. Classification and restrictions, to some extent, has a bad effect on free trading and growing of business.
 Risk of loss caused by difference in classification  Firstly, the proper classification of your item is essential to determine any licensing requirements under the Export Administration Regulations (EAR), EU Dual Use Regulation 428/2009. And subsequently exporters and importers need to be aware of how to classify the products accordingly and which category should be classified to. And finally they may be required to obtain a license.  A slight difference in classification can mean a huge difference in the duties that are paid.

Overview
TARIC builds upon the international harmonised system

See also 
Combined Nomenclature
Customs tariff
Harmonized System

References
 Foreign Agricultural Service U.S. Mission to the European Union - Combined Nomenclature

External links 
TARIC Home Page

Standards
Chemical numbering schemes
Product classifications
Economy of the European Union